Stella One Eleven were an Australian pop, rock band, which formed in September 1997. They released three studio albums, Mr Big Car (1999), In Your Hands (2000) and Stella One Eleven (October 2003). Three of the band's singles, "Go Slow Girl" (July 2001), "Out There Somewhere"/"S.S.D." (October 2003) and "She" (March 2004), reached the top 40 on the ARIA Singles Chart. At the ARIA Music Awards of 2001 they were nominated for Best Independent Release and Best Adult Contemporary Album for In Your Hands. At the previous year's ceremony their single, "Only Good for Conversation" (September 1999), was nominated for Best Independent Release. The group had disbanded by October 2005 with the members undertaking solo projects.

History

1997–2002: Formation, Mr Big Car and In Your Hands
Stella One Eleven were formed in September 1997 in Sydney when singer-songwriter Cindy Ryan went into a studio to record her debut solo album. While working with her session musicians, Ryan decided to form a pop rock band with them instead. Stella One Eleven's debut single, "Hard", appeared in 1998 and was followed by their first album, Mr Big Car, in 1999 on Candle Records.

The group's line-up was Bowden Campbell (ex-Front End Loader) on guitar, Pat Hayes (ex-Falling Joys) on bass guitar and backing vocals, Genevieve Maynard (ex-Bughouse) on guitar and backing vocals, Ryan on lead vocals and guitar, and Raphael Wittingham (ex-Clouds, Golden Rough) on drums. Most of the album's tracks were co-produced by Maynard with Tim Powles (of the Church); two tracks were produced solely by Maynard.

Additional singles issued from the album are "Mr Big Car" (June 1999), "Only Good for Conversation" (September) and "She Lies" (December). At the ARIA Music Awards of 2000, "Only Good for Conversation", was nominated for Best Independent Release.

Stella One Eleven released their second album, In Your Hands, on Wow Records in late 2000. The line-up was Hayes, Maynard and Ryan with Brian Cachia on drums and Sam Carter (ex-Dogbouy) on guitar. At the ARIA Music Awards of 2001 In Your Hands was nominated for Best Independent Release and Best Adult Contemporary Album.

It generated a top 40 single, "Go Slow Girl" (July 2001), on the ARIA Singles Chart, which was placed on high rotation by national youth radio station, Triple J. The album reached No. 13 on Alternative Albums Chart. The band wrote the theme song for National Youth Week in Australia and were appointed official Youth Week ambassadors for 2000. In October 2001 the group were guest programmers on rage.

2003–2005: Self-titled album to disbandment
After a hiatus of two years the group reconvened to release their third studio album, Stella One Eleven, on 6 October 2003. Ryan had collaborated with outside writers including Mark Seymour (of Hunters and Collectors) on "Cold" and Paul Andrews of Lazy Susan on "Paleface" and "Beautiful Boys". It reached number 12 on the ARIA Australasian Artists Albums chart. Lucinda Gardiner of Oz Music Project described it as "an unashamedly pop album that deserves more recognition then it will probably get... Ryan's lyrics are sweeter and more optimistic here than in previous recordings. There is none of the outward vitriol on [it] that is on their other albums."

They issued two singles – "Out There Somewhere"/"S.S.D. (Sweet Sweet Darling)" in October 2003 and "She" (March 2004) – the latter was produced by Paul Mac. Both singles reached the ARIA Singles Chart top 40.

By October 2005 Stella One Eleven had disbanded with both Ryan and Campbell releasing solo albums: Ryan's Love Hate Tattoo and Campbell's Crooked Mile.

Members

 Cindy Ryan – lead vocals and guitar
 Genevieve Maynard – guitar and backing vocals
 Pat Hayes – bass guitar and backing vocals
 Sam Carter – guitar
 Brian Cachia – drums
 Raphael Wittingham – drums (Mr Big Car)
 Bowden Campbell – guitar (Mr Big Car)
 Bernie Hayes – lead vocals
 Mary-Anne Cornford
 Stuart Robertson

Discography

Albums

Extended plays

Singles

Awards and nominations

ARIA Music Awards
The ARIA Music Awards is an annual awards ceremony that recognises excellence, innovation, and achievement across all genres of Australian music. They commenced in 1987. 

|-
| 2000
| "Only Good for Conversation"
| Best Independent Release
| 
|-
| rowspan="2"| 2001
| rowspan="2"|In Your Hands
| Best Adult Contemporary Album
| 
|-
| Best Independent Release
| 
|}

References

External links
  archived from the original on 19 August 2006. Accessed on 9 April 2017.
 Genevieve Maynard web site

Australian pop rock groups
Musical groups established in 1997
Musical groups disestablished in 2005
Musical groups from Sydney